Ansell is a given name. Notable people with the name include:

Ansell Clarke (1907–2002), Australian rules footballer
Ansell Collins (born 1949), Jamaican musician, composer, singer, songwriter, and producer
Ansell Wass (1832–1889), Union Army officer